Beulah is a town in the southern Mallee region of Victoria, Australia.  The town is in the Shire of Yarriambiack local government area, 395 kilometres north-west of the state capital, Melbourne. At the 2016 census, Beulah had a population of 329.

History
The town's name is taken from the Book of Isaiah, 62:4. In some English translations the word is given as "married" or "inhabited".

Beulah was established on land that was once part of Brim station.  Closer settlement began in the 1880s and the town site was proclaimed in 1891. 
A Post Office opened on May 6, 1891, and the railway from Warracknabeal opened on 5 January 1893. The line to Hopetoun opened on 6 March 1894. The town claims to be the closest to the rabbit-proof fence, established to prevent the incursion of rabbit plagues.

In January 2020, Beulah became the focus of national news coverage after the owner of a house, Cheryl Lawdorn, flew a large Wehrmacht flag featuring a swastika over her home for a fortnight. The flag drew criticism from locals, Yarriambiack Shire Council, the Australian B'nai B'rith Anti-Defamation Commission, Victoria Police, and the state premier Daniel Andrews, who referred to the flag as "disgusting". The event led to calls for a ban on people publicly displaying the swastika.

References

External links

Official town website
Yarriambiack Shire Council - Official council site

Towns in Victoria (Australia)
Wimmera
Mallee (Victoria)